Rocket Science is a studio album from Apoptygma Berzerk. It follows the same path of synth-rock trends as the band's previous album You and Me Against the World. The first single was "Apollo (Live On Your TV)" followed by "Green Queen". It was also their final album on Gun Records, released one week before the label ceased operating.

The album's theme is heavily influenced by the novel 1984 by George Orwell, as well as various conspiracy theories and The Matrix movies. The album's lyrics reflect Stephan's world view and his personal life and views.

The album also features guest vocals on multiple tracks from Benji Madden from Good Charlotte, and Amanda Palmer from The Dresden Dolls. The final track Trash is a cover of a 1996 single by Britpop band Suede.

Track listing

Personnel

Apoptygma Berzerk
Stephan Groth – vocals, programming, synth
Geir Bratland – synth, vocoders, backing vocals
Angel – guitar 
Fredrik Brarud – drums, backing vocals

Other musicians
Benji Madden – vocals
Amanda Palmer – vocal
Jonas Groth – vocals
Ida Helen Fjeld – vocals
Solveig Petersen – vocals
Chris White – spoken words
Emil Nikolaisen – guitars
Mikael Jensen – bass
Dag Anders Sandell – bass
Jon Erik Martinsen  –  MS-20
Alexander Odden  – synth

Production
Stephan Groth – producer
Bob Kraushaar – audio mixer
Willi Dammeier – audio mixer
Marcus Forsgren – audio mixer
Bjarne Stensli: – audio mixer
Emil Nikolaisen – audio mixer
Maor Appelbaum – sound designer
Howie Weinberg – mastering

Design
Alaric Hammond – cover art design
Sven Sindt – photos 
Tarjei Ekenes Krogh – photos

Charts

References

Apoptygma Berzerk albums
2009 albums
GUN Records albums